Hokkaidornis is an extinct genus of penguin-like plotopterid from the Late Oligocene of Hokkaido, Japan.

References

Pelecaniformes
Oligocene birds of Asia
Fossil taxa described in 2008
Fossils of Japan